This is a list of cricket grounds in Argentina.  The grounds included in this list have held first-class matches.

References

External links
Cricket grounds in Argentina at CricketArchive.

Cricket grounds
Cricket grounds
Argentina